Aidar Mambetaliev (born 22 July 1998) is a Kyrgyz professional footballer who plays as a defender for Rajasthan United in the I-League.

Club career

Earlier career
Mambetaliev started his professional football career at Dinamo-Manas. He also piled his trade for Alga Bishkek, Abdysh-Ata Kant, Kaganat and Alay in Kyrgyzstan. He played 46 matches, until 2022, in the Kyrgyz Premier League. In the process, he has also netted three goals.

Mambetaliev's first stint outside the country was with Maldivian outfit Club Valencia. Ococias Kyoto and Bangladesh Police are the other foreign clubs for which he has booted up.

Rajasthan United
In August 2022, Mambetaliev signed with I-League club Rajasthan United, on a two-year deal. He was made captain of the team ahead of the Durand Cup. On 20 August, he made his debut in a shock 3–2 win over ATK Mohun Bagan, in the Durand Cup. In November, they reached final of Baji Rout Cup in Odisha, and won title defeating Churchill Brothers.

Career statistics

Club

Honours
Rajasthan United
Baji Rout Cup: 2022

References

External links

1998 births
Living people